Seton Hill University is a private Catholic university in Greensburg, Pennsylvania. Formerly a women's college, it became a coeducational university in 2002 and enrolls about 2,200 students.

History 
The school was founded in 1885 by the Sisters of Charity. It is named for Elizabeth Ann Seton (1774–1821), who founded the Sisters of Charity and who, after her death, was canonized as the United States' first native-born saint. (Seton Hall University and Saint Elizabeth University in New Jersey are also named after Elizabeth Ann Seton.)

In 1914, Seton Hill Junior college was opened by the Sisters of Charity. With the approval of the Commonwealth of Pennsylvania, Seton Hill College was created four years later.

In 1946, 40 male World War II veterans were accepted as students at Seton Hill. During the 1980s, men were regularly admitted to many programs at Seton Hill College, including music and theater. In 2002, Seton Hill was officially granted university status by the Pennsylvania Department of Education.

Seton Hill University received widespread public attention after announcing a technology plan that includes providing an iPad to all full-time students, as well a 13" MacBook to all incoming freshmen. Upon graduation, students keep both devices. Beginning in the fall of 2013, new full-time students will receive an iPad Mini and new full-time freshmen will be provided with a MacBook Air. Seton Hill University is recognized as an Apple Distinguished School.

Academics
Seton Hill divides its undergraduate programs into six schools: Business, Education & Applied Social Sciences, Humanities, Natural & Health Sciences, and Visual & Performing Arts. In addition to their major, all students take liberal arts core classes in arts, mathematics, sciences, culture, history, and writing.
The university also offers twelve graduate programs. Subjects include art, writing, education, therapy, business, orthodontics, and physician assistant studies.

The typical class size for courses in the major is about 20–25. Liberal arts core classes tend to be larger, at 30-45 students.

Centers

 National Catholic Center for Holocaust Education
 Child Development Center
 Center for Family Therapy
 SHU Center for Orthodontics
 The Wukich Center for Entrepreneurial Opportunities
 Performing Arts Center
 Dance and Visual Arts Center
Robert M. Brownlee Mathematics Enrichment Center

Athletics 

Seton Hill athletics teams are the Griffins. The university is a member of the Division II level of the National Collegiate Athletic Association (NCAA), primarily competing in the Pennsylvania State Athletic Conference (PSAC) since the 2013–14 academic year. The Griffins previously competed as a member of the West Virginia Intercollegiate Athletic Conference (WVIAC) from 2006–07 to 2012–13; and in the American Mideast Conference of the National Association of Intercollegiate Athletics (NAIA) from 1999–2000 to 2006–07. During the 2006–07 school year, Seton Hill had dual membership with both the NAIA and the NCAA as part of the transition.

Seton Hill competes in 19 intercollegiate varsity sports: Men's sports include baseball, basketball, cross country, football, lacrosse, soccer, track & field and wrestling; while women's sports include basketball, cross country, equestrian, field hockey, golf, lacrosse, soccer, softball, tennis, track & field and volleyball.

History 
After president JoAnne Boyle formalized the school's new status as a university, the teams' nickname was changed from "Spirits" to "Griffins," and several men's athletics teams were added, including football. In 2006, Seton Hill announced it was transferring to NCAA Division II and joining the WVIAC as a provisional member (with full WVIAC competition in 2007–08). Prior to that, they had belonged to the NAIA and in the American Mideast.

As of July 1, 2013, following the breakup of the WVIAC, along with the University of Pittsburgh at Johnstown, also from the WVIAC, Seton Hill joined the PSAC.

In 2005, 60% of the entering class was male, due to an influx of male students who were interested in new sports programs such as football.  In 2008, the football team had a 10–3 record. The football team and the men's soccer team each won the inaugural West Virginia Intercollegiate Athletic Conference's team sportsmanship award in 2008.

In 2006, the baseball team received a berth to the NAIA World Series in the program's third year of existence.

In 2014, the baseball team had its most successful season; winning the PSAC, the Atlantic Regional, and advancing to the College World Series. The team ended up finishing top six in the country.

Notable alumni

Eileen DeSandre, actor
Ronne Froman, Rear Admiral and Commander of Navy Region Southwest
 Patricia A. Gabow '65, CEO of Denver Health
Ethel LeFrak, wife of billionaire Samuel J. LeFrak and New York City philanthropist.
Justice Maureen O'Connor, '73 and sixth woman to serve as an Ohio Supreme Court justice.
Kameron Taylor, professional basketball player
Stephanie M. Wytovich editor, novelist and poet

References

External links
 Official website
 Official athletics website

 
Former women's universities and colleges in the United States
Catholic universities and colleges in Pennsylvania
Educational institutions established in 1883
Universities and colleges in Westmoreland County, Pennsylvania
Greensburg, Pennsylvania
Association of Catholic Colleges and Universities
1883 establishments in Pennsylvania